The Central District of Jajrom County is a district (bakhsh) in Jajrom County, North Khorasan Province, Iran. At the 2006 census, its population (including the portions split off to form Garmeh County) was 39,706, in 10,001 families.  The District has one city: Jajarm. The District has two rural districts (dehestan): Golestan Rural District and Miyan Dasht Rural District.

References 

Districts of North Khorasan Province
Jajrom County